The 1997 Singha and Eagle Cement Thailand Open was a professional ranking snooker tournament that took place between 10–16 March 1997 at the Century Park Hotel in Bangkok, Thailand.

Peter Ebdon won the tournament, defeating Nigel Bond 9–7 in the final. The defending champion, Alan McManus, was eliminated by Anthony Hamilton in the first round.


Wildcard round

Main draw

References

1997 in snooker